This is a list of adult fiction books that topped The New York Times Fiction Best Seller list in 1952.

See also

 1952 in literature
 Publishers Weekly list of bestselling novels in the United States in the 1950s

References

1952
.
1952 in the United States